Lado or LADO may refer to:

Places
 Lado, Burkina Faso, a town in Burkina Faso
 Lado, South Sudan, a town in South Sudan, formerly the seat of the Lado Enclave, and Equatoria province
 Lado Enclave of the Congo Free State, in modern South Sudan
 Mount Lado, South Sudan

People 
Aldo Lado, Italian film director
Robert Lado, a founder of the Georgetown University School of Languages and Linguistics
Lado Asatiani, Georgian writer
Lado Gudiashvili, Georgian painter

Other
 The masculine counterpart of Lada, Slavic goddess of beauty
 Lado Guitars
 Language Analysis for the Determination of Origin
 Latino American Dawah Organization, an organization which promotes Islam among the Latino community within the United States
 National Folk Dance Ensemble of Croatia LADO